Leslie Erin Mahaffy (July 5, 1976 – June 16, 1991) was a Canadian murder victim of killers Paul Bernardo and Karla Homolka. At the time of her death, she was a resident of Burlington, Ontario and a Grade 9 student at M.M. Robinson High School. Mahaffy's kidnapping was one in a series of disappearances of Ontario schoolgirls in the early 1990s, including Kristen French, also a victim of Bernardo and Homolka. Prior to killing Mahaffy in 1991 and French in 1992, the pair had raped and killed Homolka's teenaged sister Tammy in 1990. The disappearances, arrests, and convictions were widely covered in Canadian media, becoming one of the most notorious crimes in Canadian history.

Family

Leslie Erin Mahaffy was born July 5, 1976. Her brother Ryan was born some years later. Her father was an oceanographer for the Canadian federal Fisheries and Oceans department, and sometimes would be on assignments away from home for weeks at a time. Her mother was a teacher.

Though she had been close to her family, when she turned fourteen, Mahaffy began to rebel and spend periods of time away from the family home but always phoned home during her absences and kept in touch with her younger brother Ryan, with whom she was very close. Shortly before her abduction, some friends had been killed in a car accident. The evening prior to her abduction, Leslie attended a memorial for one of the teens as well as an informal get-together and subsequently missed her Friday night curfew. Finding the door locked, Leslie traveled to a nearby plaza to use the pay telephone to ask a friend if she might spend the night at the friend's home but was refused. Returning home, she crossed paths with Bernardo who had been out looking into back yards, hoping to find a victim. Bernardo lured Leslie back to his nearby car and took her to the house he shared with Homolka. Later that day, Leslie's friend telephoned the Mahaffy house to inquire about Leslie's well-being and explained the call that Leslie had made after discovering that she had been locked out, prompting Leslie's mother to start searching for Leslie. Finding no trace of her daughter, she eventually became concerned and contacted the police. When Mahaffy failed to phone home on her own birthday about two weeks later, her family was certain that she had not called them because she could not.

Her mother Debbie would later become prominent in the struggle to maintain and enforce the judge's gag order about the trials of Mahaffy's killers and the videotapes they made of their own crimes, which were used as evidence against them.

Mahaffy's remains are interred under a family headstone at Burlington Memorial Gardens in Burlington, Ontario, Canada. There is also a heart-shaped garden with a plaque in Leslie's honour at M.M. Robinson High School, and a memorial bench close to her family headstone.

Kidnapping

At the time of her abduction and subsequent murder in mid-June 1991, a few weeks before her fifteenth birthday, Leslie Mahaffy was a Grade 9 student at M.M. Robinson High School in Burlington. Like many teens that age, she wore braces on her teeth.

On the evening of June 14, 1991, Mahaffy went to a funeral home to attend a wake for her friend Chris Evans, a boy who had died in a car accident earlier that week.

After the wake, a large group of teens met in the woods to drink and console one another. As the evening wound down, a couple of friends walked her home shortly before 2:00 AM, where they stayed with her while she found the side door locked. She told them the front door would surely be unlocked, and sent them home. After they left her, she found the front door was locked as well.

Now alone, Mahaffy walked to a pay phone at Macs Milk and called a friend's house for permission to sleep over. Her friend told her no, and after a lengthy conversation that ended after 2:30 AM, Mahaffy said she would go back home and wake up her own mother to get in the house.

When Mahaffy failed to appear later that day at the funerals for her friend Chris Evans and the three teens killed with him, her mother phoned the police. On June 18, Debbie Mahaffy filed the official paperwork to have her daughter sought and arrested as a runaway.

Paul Bernardo eventually admitted he had been on Keller Court, where the Mahaffy home was located, to steal license plates. He saw Leslie Mahaffy alone. He claims he told her he was breaking into the house next door and then offered her a cigarette, which he said was back at his car. When she was close enough to the car, he said he wrapped his sweatshirt quickly around her head, forced her into the vehicle, and took her to the home he shared with Homolka. Homolka's version of the story is similar, but she claims that once he got Mahaffy to the car to fetch the cigarette, he pulled a knife on the girl to get her compliance. Both agree that Homolka was not present during the kidnapping.

Murder
After 24 hours of rape and abuse by both of the killers, Mahaffy was murdered sometime on June 15, 1991. According to Homolka, Bernardo strangled Mahaffy with an electrical cord a second time when the first attempt left her unconscious for a few minutes. Homolka, a veterinary technician, had access to sedative drugs which were used to subdue Mahaffy, the same technique the pair used in the rape and inadvertent murder of Homolka's sister six months before.

Bernardo stated that he was out of the room, preparing the car to transport Mahaffy to a location where she would be released, when the heavily-drugged Mahaffy died. He has claimed he did not even know she was dead until, after putting gas in the car and taking a shower, he tried to pick her up to carry her away. He said he and Homolka panicked, and that he tried to give Mahaffy artificial respiration. Both killers agree that they gave her a teddy bear to hold during breaks between assaults.

On June 16, 1991, Bernardo and Homolka moved Mahaffy's body from an upstairs bedroom to the basement. During this time, Bernardo and Homolka hosted Homolka's family for a Father's Day dinner on the main floor of the house, with Homolka making a special effort to keep her mother from going downstairs. When the family left, Bernardo and Homolka used his grandfather's circular saw to dismember Mahaffy's body into pieces small enough to lift when covered with concrete. Later, in a confession to her aunt before revealing details to the police, Homolka claimed that Bernardo did this while she was at work on Monday. Bernardo's version asserts that she did not help him rinse and bag the body parts.

Mahaffy's body was found dismembered and encased in concrete on June 29, 1991 in Lake Gibson near St. Catharines, Ontario. The concrete block containing the torso weighed over 200 pounds. Her braces and dental records confirmed her identity.

Investigators immediately believed she had been raped and tortured. This was confirmed when videotapes were discovered in the home of Bernardo and Homolka. The tapes show that she was held hostage for approximately 24 hours and repeatedly assaulted and sodomized. After Bernardo's final bid for an appeal before the Supreme Court was rejected, the tapes were all destroyed by the Ontario government.

Bernardo's 2005 statements
Several days before Homolka's release from prison in 2005, Bernardo was interviewed by police and his lawyer, Tony Bryant. Bryant was subsequently interviewed by the media, providing Bernardo's thoughts about the release.

According to Bryant, Bernardo claimed that he had always intended to free the girls he and Homolka had held captive. Bernardo claimed that Homolka was worried that Leslie Mahaffy's blindfold had fallen off, and that she would be able to identify them. Further, Bernardo claimed that Homolka's plan was to murder Mahaffy by injecting an air bubble into her bloodstream, eventually causing an embolism.

See also
List of solved missing person cases

Video and television accounts
 Dark Heart, Iron Hand. Documentary broadcast by MSNBC. Rebroadcast as an episode of the series MSNBC Investigates retitled "To Love and To Kill" May 31, 2002  and September 4, 2007.
 Karla starring Laura Prepon and Misha Collins. Monterey Video (2007) No ISBN available. .
 The premiere episode of Wicked Attraction, a television show which focuses on couples who commit heinous crimes, focuses on Paul Bernardo and Karla Homolka. The episode, entitled "The Perfect Couple" first aired on August 7, 2008.

References

Further reading
 Burnside, Scott and Alan Cairns. Deadly Innocence. Grand Central Publishing, Warner Books edition (1995) .
 Davey, Frank. Karla's Web. Viking Adult (1994) .
 O'Neill, Brian. A Marriage Made For Murder. O'Neill Enterprises (1995) .
 Pron, Nick. Lethal Marriage: The Uncensored Truth Behind the Crimes of Paul Bernardo and Karla Homolka. Seal Books (2005). .
Williams, Stephen. Karla: A Pact with the Devil. Seal Books. (2004) .
Williams, Stephen. Invisible Darkness: The Strange Case Of Paul Bernardo and Karla Homolka. Bantam (1997) .

External links

1990s missing person cases
1991 in Ontario
1991 murders in Canada
Child abduction in Canada
Formerly missing people
June 1991 events in Canada
Missing person cases in Canada
Murder in Ontario
Rape in Canada
Torture in Canada
Incidents of violence against girls
Female murder victims